The Valdarno is a breed of black dual-purpose chicken from the lower part of the Valdarno, the valley of the Arno river, in Tuscany, central Italy. It became virtually extinct in the 20th century, but the population is recovering. It is a quite different breed from the Valdarnese, which originates in the upper Valdarno, and is white.

History

The Valdarno chicken takes its name from the Valdarno, the valley of the Arno river. It was in the past extensively raised in the lower part of the valley between Florence and the Tyrrhenian Sea and in the plains surrounding Pisa, in the areas of comuni such as Cerreto Guidi, Pontedera, Empoli, Poggibonsi and San Miniato.

The first description of the Valdarno chicken is that given by Pochini, who recommends it above all others as suitable for both small- and large-scale rearing, for its rapid growth and the maternal instinct of the hens, but who notes that it requires space and does not adapt well to close confinement. He illustrates four colour varieties, black, white, buff, and cuckoo, and notes that the black and the white are the most common. The first breed standard was presented by Maggi at a conference in Mantua in 1905; the author believed the breed to date from before 1848 and noted the predominance of the black variety, as evidenced by the local saying "pollo nero, pollo vero", or "black chicken, real chicken". The breed was described by both Pascal and Faelli in the same year.

In the following years the Valdarno then became the subject of extended and heated discussion of its authenticity, and of whether it should be considered a variety of the Livornese. Although its authenticity was eventually recognised, its numbers declined owing to competition from the White Leghorn, and despite various attempts by breeders to preserve it, continued to decline through most of the 20th century until it had virtually disappeared. Recent reconstitution and recovery of the breed was based on a small number of autochthonous birds found in the Sienese countryside, with out-crossing to Bresse and Castellana Negra. The first results were presented at Reggio Emilia in 1998, and were well received. Although numbers remain low, the Valdarno is bred to the 1905 standard, and is included in the official standard of the Federazione Italiana Associazioni Avicole, the federation of Italian poultry associations, which is the authority governing poultry breeding in Italy.

Breed numbers remain low. A study published in 2007 used a figure of approximately 200 for the total breeding stock, of which approximately 50 were cocks.

Characteristics

The Valdarno is black, with dark green lights. The legs are a dark slate colour, and the beak is black. The skin is white. The comb is medium-large, with 5–6 points. The wattles are medium-long and red, the ear-lobes oval and porcelain white. The eggs are white and weigh at least 55 g. Ring size is 18 mm for cocks, 16 mm for hens.

References 

Chicken breeds
Chicken breeds originating in Italy
Ark of Taste foods